Artūrs Gedvillo (14 July 1904 – 5 May 1983) was a Latvian sprinter. He competed in the men's 100 metres event at the 1924 Summer Olympics.

References

External links
 

1904 births
1983 deaths
Latvian male sprinters
Athletes (track and field) at the 1924 Summer Olympics
Olympic athletes of Latvia
Athletes from Riga